Alexander Elliott Trotter (1893–1948) was an English footballer who played on the left wing.

Career
Trotter played for Jarrow and Ashington, also guesting for Leeds City, Dumbarton and Raith Rovers during the war. He joined Leicester City of the Second Division for the 1920–21 season. He finished as the club's joint-top scorer (with Jock Paterson) in the 1921–22 season with eight goals. Leicester finished third in 1922–23, missing out on promotion to the First Division only due to West Ham United's superior goal average. They then dropped down to 12th in 1923–24, before moving on to league rivals South Shields. He scored 11 goals in 100 league and cup games in his four years with the "Foxes". South Shields finished ninth in 1924–25 and 1925–26, before dropping to 19th in 1926–27, just three points ahead of relegated Darlington.

He seriously injured Port Vale goalkeeper Howard Matthews, by charging him in the back in a 3–3 draw on 5 February 1927. Despite this, he signed for the Vale three months later. He was only to play 17 games for the club in 1927–28, and was given a free transfer to Manchester Central in May 1928. He later moved on to Bedlington United.

Career statistics
Source:

References

1893 births
1948 deaths
Sportspeople from Jarrow
Footballers from Tyne and Wear
English footballers
Association football outside forwards
Raith Rovers F.C. players
Dumbarton F.C. players
Renton F.C. players
Ashington A.F.C. players
Leicester City F.C. players
South Shields F.C. (1889) players
Port Vale F.C. players
Manchester Central F.C. players
Bedlington United A.F.C. players
English Football League players
Scottish Football League players